Cazadores de Artemisa (English: Artemisa Hunters) is a Cuban baseball team based in Artemisa. They are a member of the Cuban National Series and play their home games at 26 de Julio Stadium, opened in 1968 and with a capacity of 6,000 spectators.

History
In 2011, Cuban government decided to split Havana Province into two newly created administrative divisions: Artemisa Province and Mayabeque Province. This led to the disappearance of the La Habana team and to the creation of the Artemisa and Huracanes de Mayabeque teams, who started playing in the 2011–12 Cuban National Series season.

Roster

References

Baseball teams in Cuba
Artemisa
Baseball teams established in 2011
2011 establishments in Cuba